Leeuwarden railway station is the main railway station in Leeuwarden in Friesland, Netherlands. The station, which opened on 27 October 1863, is on the Arnhem–Leeuwarden railway, the Harlingen–Nieuweschans railway and the Leeuwarden–Stavoren railway. Leeuwarden was also the terminus of the North Friesland Railway which served Anjum and Harlingen via Stiens. Behind the station is a stabling point for many trains. The train services are operated by Nederlandse Spoorwegen and Arriva; of the station's six platforms, five are terminating platforms and one is a through platform.

Train services
, the following train services call at this station:
1× per hour express Intercity service Rotterdam - Utrecht - Amersfoort - Zwolle - Leeuwarden
1× per hour express Intercity service The Hague - Schiphol - Almere - Lelystad - Zwolle - Leeuwarden
1× per hour express Sneltrein service Leeuwarden - Buitenpost - Groningen
1× per hour local Sprinter service Leeuwarden - Meppel
2× per hour local Stoptrein service Leeuwarden - Sneek
1× per hour local Stoptrein service Leeuwarden - Sneek - Stavoren
2× per hour local Stoptrein service Harlingen Haven - Leeuwarden
2× per hour local Stoptrein service Leeuwarden - Groningen

Bus services
Bus services are operated by Arriva and Qbuzz.

Gallery

External links

Railway stations in Leeuwarden
Railway stations opened in 1863
Railway stations on the Staatslijn A
Railway stations on the Staatslijn B